The Hits is the first greatest hits album by American country music singer Faith Hill issued in the United States. Originally slated for release on May 8, 2007, the album was delayed several times until it was finally released on October 2, 2007.

Hill initially planned to re-record her prior hits for the album:     
Ultimately, the live version of "Stronger" (an album track from Cry), a more country sounding "Let Me Let Go" and pop remixes of "Breathe", "The Way You Love Me", and "This Kiss" are the only tracks that differ from their album versions.  The album contains all eight of her solo No. 1 Country singles in addition to two songs, "Cry" (No. 12 Country) and "There You'll Be" (No. 11 Country), which topped the AC chart.

History
The first single, "Lost" was released in May, 2007.  The song did not perform well on the Country charts peaking at #32. In September 2007, the song was released to AC radio and has peaked at #11 in January 2008. Faith debuted the second and final new track from the album, "Red Umbrella", on The Ellen DeGeneres Show on September 5. The song was released to Country radio on September 13. It peaked at #28 on the country charts. The album also features her Grammy nominated duet with Tim McGraw "I Need You".

The album debuted at #12 on the Billboard 200 and #3 on the Country Albums charts selling 69,368 copies in its first week. This became her lowest debuting album on the Billboard 200 since 1995's It Matters to Me.  A special edition of the CD was also released with a companion DVD featuring videos of some of Hill's singles.

In April 2009, after 18 months on chart, the album moved to the Billboard Top Country Catalog Albums. As of the chart dated March 9, 2013, the album has sold 446,055 copies in the US.

Track listing

Personnel

 David Angell – violin
 Greg Barnhill – background vocals
 Stephanie Bentley – background vocals
 Bruce Bouton – steel guitar
 Bekka Bramlett – background vocals
 Mike Brignardello – bass guitar
 Dean Brown – fiddle, mandolin
 Pat Buchanan – electric guitar
 Tom Bukovac – acoustic guitar, electric guitar
 Paul Bushnell – bass guitar
 Larry Byrom – acoustic guitar
 David Campbell – string arrangements, conductor
 John Catchings – cello
 Beth Nielson Chapman – background vocals
 Lisa Cochran – background vocals
 Vinnie Colaiuta – drums
 Perry Coleman – background vocals
 Bill Coumo – synthesizer
 Eric Darken – percussion
 David Davidson – violin
 Chip Davis – background vocals
 Dan Dugmore – electric guitar, steel guitar, lap steel guitar, soloist
 Glen Duncan – fiddle
 Stuart Duncan – fiddle, mandolin
 David Dunkley – percussion
 Connie Ellisor – violin
 Shannon Forrest – drums, percussion
 Paul Franklin – dobro, steel guitar
 Marti Frederiksen – acoustic guitar, electric guitar, background vocals
 Byron Gallimore – 12-string acoustic guitar, 12-string electric guitar, acoustic guitar, electric guitar, drum loops
 Sonny Garrish – steel guitar
 Vince Gill – background vocals
 Carl Gorodetzky – violin
 Jim Grosjean – viola
 Aubrey Haynie – fiddle
 Tom Hemby – gut string guitar
 Denny Hemingson – electric guitar, steel guitar
 Faith Hill – lead vocals
 Steve Hornbeak – background vocals
 Dann Huff – electric guitar
 John Barlow Jarvis – piano
 Mary Ann Kennedy – background vocals
 Jeff King – electric guitar
 Michael Landau – electric guitar
 Lee Larrison – violin
 Tim Lauer – accordion
 Paul Leim – drums
 Chris Lindsey – piano
 B. James Lowry – electric guitar
 Mark Luna – background vocals
 Tim McGraw – duet vocals on "I Need You"
 Chris McHugh – drums
 Jeff McMahon – Fender Rhodes
 Terry McMillan – percussion
 Jerry McPherson – electric guitar
 Anthony LaMarchina – cello
 John Marcus – bass guitar
 Billy Mason – drums
 Bob Mason – cello
 Brent Mason – electric guitar
 Bob Minner – acoustic guitar
 Jamie Muhoberac – Hammond B-3 organ, piano, programming, synthesizer, synthesizer programming
 Cate Myer – violin
 Steve Nathan – keyboards, synthesizer
 Craig Nelson – bass guitar
 Jimmy Nichols – keyboards, Hammond B-3 organ
 Gary Van Osdale – viola
 Mary Kathryn Van Osdale – violin
 Monet Owens – background vocals
 Richard Pagano – drums
 Kim Parent – background vocals
 Tim Pierce – electric guitar
 Kathryn Plummer – viola
 Don Potter – acoustic guitar
 Michael Rhodes – bass guitar
 Chris Rodriguez – background vocals
 Pam Rose – background vocals
 Darrell Scott – mandolin
 Tony Shanahan – bass guitar
 Ira Siegel – acoustic guitar
 Pam Sixfin – violin
 Darren Smith – electric guitar
 Karen Staley – background vocals
 Crystal Taliefero – background vocals
 Julia Tanner – cello
 Alan Umstead – violin
 Catherine Umstead – violin
 Billy Joe Walker Jr. – acoustic guitar
 Cindy Richardson-Walker – background vocals
 Biff Watson – acoustic guitar
 Lari White – background vocals
 Kris Wilkinson – string arrangements, viola
 Lonnie Wilson – drums
 Glenn Worf – bass guitar
 Curtis Young – background vocals

Release history

Chart performance

Weekly charts

Year-end charts

References 

2007 greatest hits albums
Faith Hill albums
Albums produced by Dann Huff
Albums produced by Byron Gallimore
Warner Records compilation albums
2007 video albums
Warner Records video albums